The House of Intrigue is a 1919 American crime drama film directed by Lloyd Ingraham. It was produced by Haworth Pictures Corporation and based on a novel written by Arthur Stringer.

Plot

References

External links 
 

Haworth Pictures Corporation films
Films based on American novels
1919 crime drama films
American crime drama films
Films directed by Lloyd Ingraham
American black-and-white films
American silent feature films
Film Booking Offices of America films
1919 films
1910s American films
Silent American drama films
Films with screenplays by Richard Schayer